The Michigan Department of Labor and Economic Opportunity (LEO) is a principal department of the State of Michigan.

History

Background
Two previous principal departments of Michigan existed that focused on job training, the Department of Labor and the Michigan Department of Career Development.

Department of Talent and Economic Development
On December 18, 2014, Governor Rick Snyder used his constitutional authority to reorganize the executive branch of government to create the Michigan Department of Talent and Economic Development (TED). The Michigan Economic Development Corporation (MEDC) and Michigan Strategic Fund were scheduled to be transferred into the new department. A new agency, the Talent Investment Agency (TIA), was also set to be started concurrently with the department. The Michigan Strategic Fund would take over the State Land Bank Fast Track Authority from the Michigan State Housing Development Authority.

TIA's first head was Stephanie Comai. Arwood indicated that effectively, himself as director, the TIA head and MSHDA Director Wayne Workman would the management committee for the department.

Labor and Economic Opportunity
On June 6, 2019, Governor Gretchen Whitmer signed a re-organizational executive order renaming the department to Department of Labor and Economic Opportunity effective August 11. As a part of the department's re-organization, two commissions were formed in the department, the Workers’ Disability Compensation Appeals Commission and the Unemployment Insurance Appeals Commission. The Michigan Strategic Fund's board was restructured. The formerly defunct State Lake Bank Fast Track Authority was re-formed. While the Michigan Compensation Appellate Commission was eliminated. A number of other agencies were transferred into the department. From the Department of Licensing and Regulatory Affairs were Michigan Office of New Americans as the Office for Global Michigan and Wage and Hour Division. From the Department of Health and Human Services was Michigan Rehabilitation Services. Also transferred in were: Michigan State Housing Development Authority, State Historic Preservation Office, State Historic Preservation Review Board, Unemployment Insurance Agency, Michigan Council for Rehabilitation Services, Michigan Community Service Commission, Asian Pacific American Affairs Commission, Board of health Safety and Compliance and Appeals, Bureau of Services for Blind Person, Commission for Blind Person, Commission on Middle Eastern American Affairs, Employment Relations Commission, Hispanic/Latino Commission of Michigan, Michigan Occupational Safety and Health Administration, Worker's Compensation Agency and Worker's Compensation Board of Magistrates. The MiSTEM Advisory Council was supplanted by the Michigan Science, Technology, Engineering and Mathematics Education Advisory Council formed within the department. Detroit's executive director of workforce development Jeff Donofrio was appointed by Whitmer as the department director.

Talent Investment Agency

The Talent Investment Agency (TIA) started concurrently with the department, taking over activities previously carried out by Michigan State Housing and Development Authority, the Workforce Development Agency, the Governor's Talent Investment Board and the Unemployment Insurance Agency.

Unemployment Insurance Agency
The Unemployment Insurance Agency (UIA) is the agency through which Michigan provides unemployment compensation.

References

External links
Michigan Executive Order 2014-12

Labor and Economic Opportunity